The Cornell—Randall—Bailey Roadhouse (also known as the Log Gift and Curtain Shoppe) is an historic building located at 2737 Hartford Avenue (United States Route 6) in western Johnston, Rhode Island.  The oldest portion of this -story wood-frame structure was built in the late 18th century by Samuel Steere, and was substantially enlarged for use as a tavern in 1821 by Daniel Cornell.  Business at the tavern declined when railroads rendered the highway less important, and the building was adapted for use as a bordello and gambling house in the early 20th century.  In the 1970s it was converted for use as a gift shop.

The building was listed on the National Register of Historic Places on May 10, 1984.

See also
National Register of Historic Places listings in Providence County, Rhode Island

References

Commercial buildings completed in 1799
Commercial buildings on the National Register of Historic Places in Rhode Island
Buildings and structures in Johnston, Rhode Island
National Register of Historic Places in Providence County, Rhode Island